Hirekodathakallu Venkataramaiah Thulasiram is an Indian bioorganic chemist, chemical biologist and a principal scientist at the National Chemical Laboratory of the Council of Scientific and Industrial Research. he is known for his studies in the fields of biocatalysis and organic synthesis, specifically on isoprenoid biosynthesis. The Department of Biotechnology of the Government of India awarded him the National Bioscience Award for Career Development, one of the highest Indian science awards, for his contributions to biosciences, in 2015.

Biography 

H. V. Thulasiram, born in Hirekodathakallu, Tumkur Taluk and District of the south Indian state of Karnataka, completed his master's degree at Bangalore University in 1994 and joined the Indian Institute of Science for his doctoral studies which earned him a PhD in 2001. Subsequently, he proceeded to the US where he did his post-doctoral studies at the University of Iowa during 2000–03 and at the University of Utah from 2003 to 2006. On his return to India, he joined the National Chemical Laboratory, an autonomous research centre of the Council of Scientific and Industrial Research in 2008 as a scientist and serves as the principal scientist at the department of biochemistry.

Thulasiram focuses his research on biosynthesis and biocatalysis and is known to have carried out extensive studies of isoprenoid biosynthetic pathways. His studies have been documented by way of a number of articles and ResearchGate, an online repository of scientific articles has listed 73 of them. He holds two patents, Isolation and purification of shikimic acid from plant sources and Microbial chiral resolution of cyclic and acyclic acetates to enantiomerically pure (R)-alcohols.

Awards and honors 
The Department of Biotechnology (DBT) of the Government of India awarded him the National Bioscience Award for Career Development, one of the highest Indian science awards in 2015.

Selected bibliography

See also 

 Mevalonate pathway
 Shikimic acid

Notes

References

External links 
 

N-BIOS Prize recipients
Indian scientific authors
Living people
Indian academics
Scientists from Karnataka
Indian biochemists
Indian Institute of Science alumni
Bangalore University alumni
University of Utah alumni
University of Iowa alumni
Indian patent holders
1971 births
21st-century Indian inventors